True as Steel is the third studio album by German heavy metal band Warlock, released in 1986.

The EP Fight for Rock, which contained many songs from this album, was Warlock's first success outside of Europe, charting on the US Billboard Hot 100; the music video for the song "Fight for Rock" was aired on MTV's Headbangers Ball.

Track listing

Personnel

Warlock
Doro Pesch – vocals
Niko Arvanitis – guitar
Peter Szigeti – guitar
Frank Rittel – bass guitar
Michael Eurich – drums

Production
Henry Staroste - producer, mixing
Rainer Assmann - engineer
Garth Richardson - assistant engineer
Michael Wagener - mixing at Amigo Studios, Hollywood, California
Mastered at Sterling Sound, New York
Peter Zimmermann - management

References

1986 albums
Warlock (band) albums
Vertigo Records albums
Mercury Records albums